Yajur may refer to:

 Yajurveda, the third of the four canonical texts of Hinduism
 Yajur, Haifa, a Palestinian Arab village depopulated in 1948